Tayaramma Bangarayya is a 1979 Indian Telugu-language film starring Sowcar Janaki as Tayaramma and Kaikala Satyanarayana as Bangarayya. Chandra Mohan, Ranganath, Madhavi, Sangeetha play supporting characters. Chiranjeevi makes a guest appearance in the film. The film was remade in Tamil as Sathya Sundharam (1981) with Sivaji Ganesan in the lead role and in Hindi as Shrimaan Shrimati (1982) with Sanjeev Kumar as the lead.

Plot
The film is about a good samaritan couple Tayaramma (Janaki) and Bangarayya (Satyanarayana). They try to repair the marriages of young couples. They successfully do this as a social responsibility. When contrasting personalities Aruna (Madhavi) and Vani (Sangeetha) get married and have problems in their married life with husbands Chandra Mohan and Ranganath respectively, Tayaramma and Bangarayya step in.

Cast
 Kaikala Satyanarayana as Bangarayya
 Sowcar Janaki as Tayaramma
 Chandra Mohan
 Ranganath
 Madhavi as Aruna
 Sangeetha  as Vani
 Chhaya Devi as Ranganath's mother
 Rajababu
 Allu Ramalingaiah as Father of Aruna
 Sarath Babu
 Chiranjeevi

Soundtrack
 "Aanaadu Eenaadu Enaadu Aadadanni Aatabommaga Chesadu Magavadu"
 "My Name is Bangarayya Ne Cheppinde Bangaramayya"
 "Ore ore ore oorukora ooradinchnduku Ammaledura"

References

External links
 

1979 films
Films scored by K. V. Mahadevan
Telugu films remade in other languages
1970s Telugu-language films
Films directed by Kommineni Seshagiri Rao